The People's State of Hesse was one of the constituent states of Germany from 1918 to 1945, as the successor to the Grand Duchy of Hesse after the defeat of the German Empire in World War I, on the territory of the current German states of Hesse and Rhineland-Pfalz. 
The State was established after Grand Duke Ernest Louis was deposed on 9 November 1918. The term "People's State" referred to the fact that the new state was a Republic (rather than implying that it was socialist) and was used in the same manner as the term Free State, which was employed by most of the other German States in this period.

Like the Grand Duchy, the capital was Darmstadt and the state consisted of provinces Upper Hesse (capital Gießen), Starkenburg (capital Darmstadt) and Rhenish Hesse (capital Mainz). The area of the state was 7,692 km²; it had 1,347,279 inhabitants in 1925. Around two-thirds professed Protestantism, the other third were Roman Catholics.

Under the Law on the Reconstruction of the Reich of 30 January 1934, the Nazi government abolished the People's State's Landtag and transferred sovereignty from the People's State to the Reich, converting Hesse into an administrative unit of the central government, though formally it retained some local government.

After the German surrender in May 1945, at the end of World War II, Upper Hesse and Starkenburg formed part of the American occupation zone, while Rhenish Hesse, on the left bank of the Rhine, fell within the French occupation zone. On September 19, 1945, American administrators merged the section of the People's State of Hesse with the Prussian provinces of Hesse and Nassau and Frankfurt am Main to form Greater Hesse. Greater Hesse was renamed Hesse on December 1, 1946, and later became one of the federal states of West Germany. The parts of the state on the left bank of the Rhine became part of the new state of Rhineland-Palatinate (Rheinland-Pfalz) on 30 August 1946.

History

Establishment

On 8 November 1918, some of the troops stationed in Darmstadt revolted. Grand Duke Ernest Louis reacted by appointing a State Council (Staatsrat), composed of the Grand Duke, his ministers, and two members drawn from each of the parties represented in the Grand Duchy's parliament.

The next day, the Darmstadt Workers' and Soldiers' Council responded by declaring that the monarchy was abolished and entrusting Carl Ulrich, the leader of the Social Democratic Party (SDP) in Hesse, with the task of forming a government. Although the republic had been unilaterally declared by the Workers' and Soldiers' Council, Carl Ulrich was a strong supporter of representative democracy. On 27 November, he instructed the state bureaucracy to accept instructions exclusively from the transitional government and not from the Workers' and Soldiers' Councils. At the same time, free elections were scheduled for 26 January 1919. On 10 December 1918, the Ordinance for the election of a constitutional convention for the Republic of Hesse was published in the Hessian government's gazette, along with some basic laws, drafted by Carl Ulrich.

Weimar Republic
In accordance with the Treaty of Versailles, approximately 40% of the state's territory (in particular, Rhine Hesse and part of Starkenburg) was occupied by the French Army from January 1919 until June 30, 1930.

In the first state elections on 26 January 1919, the SPD received 44.5% of the vote and Ulrich formed a second cabinet with the German Democratic Party (DDP) and the Centre Party which took office in February. The state constitution came into force on 20 March 1920, and Ulrich continued in office as State-President. The SDP was re-elected in 1921 (32.6%), 1924 (35.2%), and 1927 (32.6%) and maintained the same coalition. After celebrating his 75th birthday in office in 1928, Ulrich retired and was succeeded as State-President by fellow Social Democrat Bernhard Adelung.

In the November 1931 elections, Adelung's coalition suffered a severe loss, winning only 37.1% of the vote (SDP: 21.4%, Centre: 14.3%; DDP: 1.4%). The Nazi party won 37.1% of the vote and the Communist Party won 13.6%. As a result, it was not possible for any party to form a government and Adelung remained in place as head of a caretaker government. In a second election on 19 June 1932, the Nazi party increased their portion of the vote to 44%, but it remained impossible for any party to form a government. After the Nazi victory in the March 1933 federal election, they strongly demanded control of the State government. On 13 March, the Centre Party agreed to form a coalition with the Nazi party and  became State President.

Nazification

The first step in the Nazification of the Free State was the appointment of Jakob Sprenger, the Gauleiter of Gau Hesse-Nassau, as Reichsstatthalter ("Reich lieutenant") of the State on 5 May 1933. Over the course of 1933, Sprenger reduced the government of the Free State through various ordinances and personnel decisions. Sprenger claimed the right to make such decisions even when his position as Reichsstatthalter did not legitimately entitle him to do so. By the end of the year, he had reduced the number of ministers from five to one minister and a state secretary, and had reduced the number of ministerial Beamte ("civil servants") from forty to nine. All ministries were united into a single "Hessian State Ministry" (Hessischen Staatsministerium) and the Minister-President lost the title of State President (Staatspräsident).

In the process, Spenger prevailed in a personal power battle with Minister-President Werner. Although Werner was a Nazi party member, he attempted to maintain a form of state administration which was more like the pre-Nazi form and he supported police commissioner Werner Best against the Sturmabteilung (SA). Above all, Werner fought against Sprenger's attempts to merge the Free State with the other territories of the Gau Hesse-Nassau (which were in the southern portion of the Prussian province of Hesse-Nassau). The conflict escalated when Sprenger sought to unite the four chambers of commerce within the Gau. Werner appealed directly to Adolf Hitler, but had no success. Finally, on 20 September 1933, Sprenger forced Werner to retire as Minister-President and appointed Philipp Wilhelm Jung in his place, who bore only the title of State Minister (Staatsminister).

The Law on the Reconstruction of the Reich of 30 January 1934 abolished the People's State's Landtag and transferred sovereignty from the People's State to the Reich. The state government was subordinated to the Reich government. The Reich government extended its constitutional authority over Hesse. Hesse ceased to possess independence and was henceforth a legal subject (Rechtssubjekt) of the central government, without the status of a state (Staatscharakter), though formally it remained a self-governing unit. After Sprenger and Jung came into conflict with one another at the start of 1935, Hitler appointed Sprenger as the head of government in the People's State in the Reichsstatthalter Law. The People's State was the second state of Germany, after the Free State of Saxony, in which the leadership of the local Nazi Gau  had completely replaced the local state government. The deputy Gauleiter  became the State Secretary in Sprenger's State cabinet, which contained no other ministers. 

On 1 April 1937, Sprenger promulgated a law abolishing the provinces of Upper Hesse, Rhenish Hesse, and Starkenburg.

Post-War abolition 

After the German surrender in May 1945, at the end of World War II, the Rhine river formed the boundary between the French and American occupation zones, meaning that Rhenish Hesse was in the French zone, while the rest of the state lay in the American Zone.

On 14 April 1945, Ludwig Bergsträsser was entrusted by the US military government with the task of building a regional administration, as Chairman of a "German Government" based in Darmstadt (his title was changed to "President" on 8 May 1945). Around the beginning of August, Bergsträsser's authority was extended over the whole of the former provinces of Starkenburg and Upper Hesse and his administration was renamed as the "German Government of the State of Hesse".

After the proclamation of Greater Hesse by the American military administration on 19 September 1945, the Darmstadt-based "German government" was renamed the "Government President of Hesse" on 4 November 1945, and finally the "Government President of Darmstadt" on 21 January 1946. Thus the People's State became the Darmstadt  within the State of Hesse. 

Politics

Constitution
After the proclamation of the People's State on 9 November 1918, the first Landtag was elected on 26 January 1919. This parliament enacted a preliminary constitution for the new state on 20 February and began a process of consultations in the Landtag, which served as a constitutional convention. The final constitution of the state was promulgated on 12 December 1919. It was subsequently altered three times:
 Law of 4 November 1924
 Law of 27 September 1927
 Law of 28 March 1930

Landtag

Under Article 17 ff. of the constitution, the Landtag consisted of seventy members, who were elected by proportional representation for a three year term. The minimum age for election was twenty-five. All male citizens over the age of twenty had the right to vote. The tasks of the Landtag were: legislating, passing a budget, electing the Minister-president ("Staatspräsident"), and confirming the selection of ministers. Under the Law on the Renovation of the Reich of 30 January 1934, the Landtag was abolished.

The seat of the Landtag was the Ständehaus on Luisenplatz in Darmstadt. The structure had been built between 1836 and 1839 and was destroyed during the Second World War.

Government
Under Article 37 of the Hessian constitution, the Minister-President had the title of State-President ("Staatspräsident") and the cabinet was known as the "Entire Ministry" ("Gesamtministerium"). 

Under the Provisional Law and Second Law on the Coordination of the States with the Reich of 31 March and 7 April 1933 and the Law on the Reconstruction of the Reich of 30 January 1934, the sovereignty of the German states was ended. After that, the state government's functions were mostly taken over by the regional branch of the Nazi Party, Gau Hesse-Nassau, which also controlled the neighbouring Nassau province of Prussia, and the position of Minister-President was held by the Gauleiter from 1935.

Administrative divisions

The People's State inherited the Grand Duchy of Hesse's division into three provinces: Starkenburg, Rhenish Hesse, and Upper Hesse, which were themselves divided into a total of eighteen Kreise ("districts"). The state's territory also included eight exclaves of Baden and Prussia, and there were eleven Hessian enclaves within Baden.

After the abolition of provincial and district councils in 1936, the provinces were eliminated in 1937. In 1938, there was a comprehensive reform at the district level. The districts of Bensheim, Schotten, and Oppenheim were abolished on 1 November 1938, reducing the total number of districts to fifteen. At the same time, the cities of Darmstadt, Giessen, Mainz, Offenbach am Main, and Worms were made independent Stadtkreise ("urban districts"). From 1 January 1939, all Kreise were renamed Landkreise ("rural districts"). This arrangement of the districts remained in place until the end of the Second World War in 1945.

References

Bibliography

External links
 
 

States of the Weimar Republic
Former states and territories of Rhineland-Palatinate
Former states and territories of Hesse